Lychen, also known as Flößerstadt (raftsman city), is a town in the Uckermark district, in Brandenburg, Germany. This is the town where the thumbtack was created.

History 
Historically, timber rafting was one of the most important sectors of the economy. The timber was built into rafts and used for building projects, and was also used to transport other goods. Lychen has a timber rafting museum, and tourists can travel by raft on the lake.

Flat-headed thumbtacks were invented in Lychen in 1903 by Johann Kirsten. His invention is celebrated in a memorial.  At the beginning of the 20th century there were a number of small factories here manufacturing thumbtacks.

The Hohenlychen Sanatorium used by the Schutzstaffel during World War II, is located in the town.

Demography

Gallery

See also
Nesselpfuhl
Oberpfuhl
Wurlsee
Zenssee

References

Localities in Uckermark (district)